Konrad III the Old ( – 28 December 1412) was a Duke of Oleśnica, Koźle, half of Bytom and half of Ścinawa since 1377 (until 1403 with his father as co-ruler).

He was the only son of Konrad II the Gray, Duke of Oleśnica, by his wife Agnes, daughter of Casimir I, Duke of Cieszyn.

Life
In 1377 his father named him co-ruler of all his lands, as his only son and heir. Konrad III began his reign alone only in 1403, after his father's death. Little is known about his reign.

Marriage and issue
By 1380 he married with Judith (also named Jutta or Guta) (d. 26 June 1416), whose origins are unknown. They had seven children:
Konrad IV the Older (b. ca. 1384 – d. 9 August 1447).
Konrad V Kantner (b. ca. 1385 – d. 10 September 1439).
Konrad VI the Dean (b. ca. 1391 – d. 3 September 1427).
Konrad VII the White (b. aft. 1396 – d. 14 February 1452).
Konrad VIII the Younger (b. aft. 1397 – d. by 5 September 1444).
Euphemia (b. ca. 1404? – d. 27 November 1442), married firstly on 14 January 1420 to Elector Albert III of Saxony and secondly in 1432 to Prince George I of Anhalt-Dessau.
Hedwig (b. ca. 1405/16? – d. by 25 June 1454), married by 1430 to Duke Henry IX the Older of Głogów.

References

Genealogical database by Herbert Stoyan
This article was translated from his original in Polish Wikipedia.

|-

|-

|-

1350s births
1412 deaths
Piast dynasty